HMS Tweed (K250) was a  of the Royal Navy (RN). Tweed was built to the RN's specifications as a Group I River-class frigate,  though Tweed was one of the few powered by a turbine engine.  She served in the North Atlantic during World War II.

Background 

As a River-class frigate, Tweed was one of 151 frigates launched between 1941 and 1944 for use as anti-submarine convoy escorts, named after rivers in the United Kingdom. The ships were designed by naval engineer William Reed, of Smith's Dock Company of South Bank-on-Tees, to have the endurance and anti-submarine capabilities of the  sloops, while being quick and cheap to build in civil dockyards using the machinery (e.g. reciprocating steam engines instead of turbines) and construction techniques pioneered in the building of the s. Its purpose was to improve on the convoy escort classes in service with the Royal Navy at the time, including the Flower class.

Tweed was funded through the Warship Week programme, with Hatfield, Hertfordshire raising over £150,000 to pay for the construction of the ship. The ship was adopted by the town in May 1943, with a plaque bearing the district's coat of arms being installed on the ship soon after.

War Service 

After commissioning in April 1943, Tweed participated in anti-submarine warfare exercises off Lough Foyle and served in convoy escort missions.

In late September 1943, Tweed rammed a U-boat.

Tweed was part of the escort group that sank  on 20 November 1943.

On 7 January 1944, Tweed was about 600 miles west of Cape Ortegal in the Atlantic Ocean, serving as part of the 5th Escort Group. At 17:11 a GNAT torpedo fired by  struck Tweed, which sank with the loss of 83 lives.  picked up 44 survivors.

References

External links 
 
 

1942 ships
River-class frigates of the Royal Navy
World War II frigates of the United Kingdom
Maritime incidents in January 1944
World War II shipwrecks in the Atlantic Ocean
Ships sunk by German submarines in World War II